Royal Penny Alden (July 22, 1863 – August 7, 1937) was an American politician and newspaper editor.

Alden was born in Tamaroa, Illinois and went to the public schools. He lived in Pinckneyville, Illinois and was the editor of the Pickneyville Democrat newspaper. Alden served in the Illinois Senate from 1901 to 1907 and was a Democrat. He also worked as a cashier in the First National Bank. Alden died at his home in Pinckneyville from a long illness.

Notes

External links

1863 births
1937 deaths
People from Pinckneyville, Illinois
Businesspeople from Illinois
Editors of Illinois newspapers
Democratic Party Illinois state senators